Štefan Marko Daxner,  (22 December 1822, Tiszolcz, Gömör-Kis-Hont, Kingdom of Hungary, Austrian Empire  11 April 1891, Tiszolc, Kingdom of Hungary) was an ethnic Slovak lower nobleman, politician, lawyer, and poet in the Kingdom of Hungary. He was a member of what became known as the Ľudovít Štúr generation.

His family is an old lower noble family, which emigrated from Switzerland to the Kingdom of Hungary in the 14th century.

Biography 

Daxner studied at the Lutheran Lyceum (preparatory high school plus freshmen college) of Pressburg (Pozsony, today's Bratislava) and at the College of Prešov (Eperjes). Between 1846 and 1872 he was a lawyer in Tisovec (Tiszolc), an official of several counties and an associate judge of the Commercial Court of Debrecen.

In 1847, just before the 1848-1849 Revolution, Daxner outlined a program unifying the requests for national (Slovak), cultural, political and social liberties. He was sentenced to death by Hungarian authorities in 1848, but was freed by the Austrian Imperial and Royal Army (which was fighting together with Slovaks against the Hungarians) and became a captain of a unit of Slovak volunteers during the 1848-1849 revolution.

He was a co-author of the Slovak Requests of Liptovský Mikuláš (Liptószentmiklós, 1848), Requests of the Slovak Nation (1848), Memorandum of the Slovak Nation in 1861, and was one of the founders of the Matica slovenská (Slovak Foundation) in 1863. He was also a founder of the first Slovak Gymnasium in Revúca (Nagyrőce) in 1862.

He is buried at the National Cemetery in Martin.

Philosophical views 
Lukáš Perný emphasizes that Daxner transformed Rousseau's idea of equality between people into the idea of ​​equality between nations and also adds that Daxner was one of the most advanced social and philosophers of law in the Slovak 19th century.  
Dalimír Hajko states that "all of Daxner's political considerations published in the press were directly connected primarily with questions of practical ethics and philosophical questions of law, because it was these problem areas that most recently connected with the national emancipation process…"  
Rudolf Dupkala recalls that Daxner followed the Štúr´s understanding of the nation, the concept of the social contract according to J. J. Rousseau  and the French Revolution.

Sources 
 Brief Biography @ Osobnosti.
 Biographical notes @ O Škole. 
 Brief biography @ the Prešov website.

External links

References 
 

1822 births
1891 deaths
People from Tisovec
People from the Kingdom of Hungary
Hungarian nobility
Slovak nobility
Hungarian people of Swiss descent
Slovak people of Swiss descent
Slovak National Party (historical) politicians
19th-century Hungarian writers
19th-century Slovak people
19th-century Hungarian lawyers
Slovak writers
Burials at National Cemetery in Martin